Moor Monkton is a village and civil parish in the Harrogate district of North Yorkshire, England.

History
Moor Monkton is mentioned in the Domesday Book as a small settlement belonging to Richard son of Herfast. The name of Moor, was added to the name Monkton to distinguish it from Nun Monkton, which is over the other side of the River Nidd. The name Monkton, which has been recorded variously as Munechatun, Monketon super Moram, Munketun, and Moore Monkton, means the town of the monks. Historically, the village was in the Wapentake of Ainsty, which meant that it was in the West Riding of Yorkshire. The village is one of the waypoints on the  Ainsty Bounds Walk that covers the old boundaries of the Ainsty.

The manor of Moor Monkton was originally owned by the Ughtred family from about the 13th century. It has also been owned by the Neville family and the Earls of Salisbury in the 15th century and eventually the Slingsby family. Sir Francis Slingsby bought the estates from the Seymour family about 1560.

The original seat for the manor was "Rede House" situated to the west of the village. It was a moated building that had been crenellated in the 14th century by Sir Thomas Ughtred. The modern Red House lies 50m south east of this site and was built around 1607 to replace the old house.

The Red House School Chapel in Hall Lane is a Grade II listed building. An early 17th century chapel, that was consecrated in 1618, is a brick built building with a slate roof.

Geography
The River Nidd is to the immediate north, with the River Ouse to the east. The village used to have a railway link at the  railway station on the Harrogate Line, though this station closed in 1958. Buses call at the crossroads with the A59, south of the village, twice a day, running between Ripon and York.

Demography

Population

Religion
The parish church, dedicated to All Saints, dates in part from the 12th century. It was restored in 1879 by James Fowler, who probably added the chancel east window, and one at the south of the nave.

Notable people
James Hampton (1721–1778), Rector and author
John Shepherd (1765–1848), jockey
Henry Yeoman (1816–1897), Rector
Cyril Lemprière (1870–1939), head master and rugby player

References

External links

 Moor Monkton Mercury, UK individual registrant web site
 Moor Monkton Village Website, UK individual registrant web site

Villages in North Yorkshire
Civil parishes in North Yorkshire